The 2014 South Seas Island Resort Women's Pro Classic was a professional tennis tournament played on outdoor hard courts. It was the second edition of the tournament which was part of the 2014 ITF Women's Circuit, offering a total of $50,000 in prize money. It took place in Captiva Island, Florida, United States, on November 3–9, 2014.

Singles entrants

Seeds 

1 Rankings as of October 27, 2014

Other entrants 
The following players received wildcards into the singles main draw:
  CiCi Bellis
  Edina Gallovits-Hall
  Anne-Liz Jeukeng
  Bernarda Pera

The following players received entry from the qualifying draw:
  Kateryna Bondarenko
  Mayo Hibi
  Tatjana Maria
  Jasmine Paolini

The following player received entry into the singles main draw as a lucky loser:
  Beatriz Haddad Maia

The following players received entry with a special exempt:
  Jennifer Brady
  Maria Sanchez

The following player received entry with a protected ranking:
  Alexa Glatch

Champions

Singles 

  Edina Gallovits-Hall def.  Petra Martić 6–2, 6–2

Doubles 

  Gabriela Dabrowski /  Anna Tatishvili def.  Asia Muhammad /  Maria Sanchez 6–3, 6–3

External links 
 Official website 
 2014 South Seas Island Resort Women's Pro Classic at ITFtennis.com

2014 ITF Women's Circuit
2014 in American tennis
November 2014 sports events in the United States
2014 in sports in Florida
Tennis tournaments in Florida